Ola Sundell (born March 19, 1952, Hammerdal) is a Swedish politician of the Moderate Party, member of the Riksdag since 1994.  Sundell has been the Moderate party's spokesman on Sámi issues.

References

Members of the Riksdag from the Moderate Party
Living people
1952 births
Members of the Riksdag 2002–2006
Place of birth missing (living people)